Archibald Cunningham (30 April 1879 – 18 March 1915) was a Scottish professional footballer who played as a goalkeeper in the Scottish League for Leith Athletic.

Personal life 
Cunningham was born in Rosewell and grew up in Lasswade. He enlisted in the Highland Light Infantry in March 1903 and later worked as a miner at the Woolmet Pits. In September 1914, shortly after the outbreak of the First World War, Cunningham re-enlisted as a private in the Highland Light Infantry. Cunningham was killed in France on 18 March 1915 after the Battle of Neuve Chapelle and is commemorated on the Le Touret Memorial.

References

1879 births
1915 deaths
Scottish footballers
Association football goalkeepers
Leith Athletic F.C. players
Scottish Football League players
British Army personnel of World War I
British military personnel killed in World War I
Highland Light Infantry soldiers
Glentoran F.C. players
NIFL Premiership players
Sportspeople from Midlothian